Nebria catenata is a species of ground beetle from Nebriinae subfamily that is endemic to the US state of Colorado.

References

catenata
Beetles described in 1913
Beetles of North America
Endemic fauna of Colorado